Thomas Alan Stephenson FRS (19 January 1898 – 3 April 1961) was a British naturalist, and marine biologist, specialising in sea anemones.

Early life 
Thomas Alan Stephenson, who went by his middle name, was born on 19 January 1898 in Burnham-on-Sea in Surrey, England. He was the eldest of three born to Thomas Stephenson, a Wesleyan minister and amateur botanist, and Margaret Stephenson (née Fletcher); a brother and sister would follow.

The first six years of Stephenson's life were spent in Richmond, Surrey, where his father was a tutor at Richmond Theological College; his mother's father was the college's governor. These years, according to his obituary, "were the pleasantest in Alan Stephenson’s childhood". As Stephenson later recalled, "[w]e lived in the Governor’s well appointed house, and had the run of the large College grounds and kitchen-garden, so that we were brought up in all the surroundings and circumstances usual to gentlefolk of good education in the Edwardian period. We were surrounded by flower-gardens, had Richmond Park and the Terrace Gardens and river close at hand (not to mention all the rather more remote attractions of the London area), and were provided with an adequate staff of well trained nurse maids, servants and gardeners." In 1904, Stephenson's father left the college and assumed the traditional role of a Wesleyan minister: "circuits," typically three years each, spent in different locations. These circuits began at Clapham, and included stints at (amongst many other locations) Wrexham, Timperley, and Aberystwyth. The frequent moves were difficult for Stephenson, whose education was inevitably fragmented, and who found it impossible to establish childhood friendships.

Education 
Stephenson attended schools in both Clapham and Wrexham. Living in Wrexham introduced Stephenson to Harold Drinkwater, a physician and amateur botanist who was also a skilled painter. "Dr Drinkwater", Stephenson later wrote, "was a remarkable man. Gifted in drawing, he made no special use of his ability until about the age of 60, when an interest in botany led him to begin painting a long series of portraits of British plants. For this purpose he invented a method of his own. Maintaining that a portrait of a plant looked very unnatural against a white background, he taught himself to paint it on rather rough sage-green paper, using Chinese white in the undercoats as a foundation for the brilliant colours of the overpainting. In a few years he produced a remarkable series of paintings, many of which are now in the National Museum of Wales at Cardiff. I was fortunate enough to know him during his most productive period, and he was more than kind to me. He allowed me to paint flowers with him, so that I learnt all he could teach; he took me on his rounds with him; he and his wife made me permanently welcome at their house; and he procured anatomical material for me through which I made my first acquaintance with human anatomy. This friendship was maintained as long as he lived, after my family left Wrexham." After Wrexham, Stephenson boarded at Kingswood School in Bath. Living in a 50-person dormitory and with few places to sit besides the library and classrooms, Stephenson eschewed school games in favor of long walks in the country. 

Stephenson's academic career was perhaps due only to the accident of his father's travels taking the family to Aberystwyth from 1914 to 1919. Stephenson matriculated at University College, Aberystwyth in October 1915, although his studies were interrupted by illness: tubercular infections of abdominal and cervical glands which later involved the appendix, requiring an operation and time in a sanatorium. This meant an atypical college experience, involving both coursework and private instruction. Stephenson came under the particular wing of the zoologist and geographer H. J. Fleure, a "unique and remarkable man", in Stephenson's words, who "encouraged me unflaggingly from the start". Fleure nurtured Stephenson's already-developing interest in sea anemones, and saw him appointed as student-demonstrator in 1916. Fleur also facilitated access for Stephenson to the sea anemones collected during the 1910–1913 Terra Nova Expedition to Antarctica, and directed Stephenson's study of them. This resulted in the first of several articles on the subject, published when Stephenson was 20. In 1920 and with Fleure's backing, Stephenson was permitted to obtain a Master of Science on the strength of his publications.

From 1920 to 1922 or 1923, Stephenson undertook research work at Aberystwyth, backed by a grant from the Department of Scientific and Industrial Research. Stephenson also began collaborating with his father on a series of papers on orchids. The two coauthored more than 20 papers and notes between 1920 and 1926. Much of this work focused on the genera Epipactis and Dactylorhiza. "Perhaps their most important single contribution", according to V. S. Summerhayes, the botanist in charge of the orchid herbarium at Royal Botanical Gardens, Kew, "was their recognition and definition of Orchis purpurella"—now Dactylorhiza purpurella—"which is now known as a widely spread member of the British flora". Another contribution was to recognize the distinction between the variants Epipactis dunensis (now recognized as a species) and Epipactis phyllanthes var. vectensis. In 1923 and again with Fleure's backing, Stephenson obtained a Doctor of Science in the same way he obtained his Masters; the publications submitted in support of his degree included those on both sea anemones and orchids.

Career 
In 1922 or 1923, Stephenson was appointed lecturer in zoology at University College, London. Stephenson's work on orchids and sea anemones continued, and in 1928, he published the first of two volumes of The British Sea Anemones. Work on the second volume would be delayed, however, for that same year, Stephenson joined the 1928 Great Barrier Reef expedition at the invitation of Maurice Yonge, the expedition's leader. Stephenson was "an obvious choice", Yonge later wrote, given "his intimate acquaintance with the group of animals most closely allied to the madreporarian corals and his intense interest in marine biology".

Stephenson held a number of academic posts in Britain, and at the University of Cape Town, South Africa. His final position was that of Professor and Head of the Department of Zoology at the University College of Wales, Aberystwyth.

The National Marine Biological Library at the Marine Biological Association in Plymouth hold some of his personal and scientific records, including paintings, negatives and notebooks on South Africa.

Personal life 
Stephenson married Anne Wood in 1922. She was the younger of twin sisters born to Joseph Dore Wood, the secretary for the Barry Graving Dock and Engineering Company, which built the south Wales docks, and Anna Eliza Wood. The Stephensons had no children.

Publications

Books 
 
 
 
 
 Bound copy held by the National Art Library, along with photographs intended as plates.
 
 Bound copy (in two volumes) held by the National Art Library, along with photographs intended as plates.
 Quoted in a lecture by Alister Hardy:

Chapters

Articles 
  
  
  
  
 
  
  
  
  
  
  
  
 
  
  
  
  
 
  
  
  
  
  
  
  
  
  
  
  
  
  
 
  
  
  
  
 see also

Other

Notes

References

Bibliography 
  
  
  
  
  
  
  
  
  
  
  
 
 
  
  
  
  
  
  
 

1898 births
1961 deaths
People from Burnham-on-Sea
20th-century British zoologists
Fellows of the Royal Society
Alumni of Aberystwyth University
Academic staff of the University of Cape Town
20th-century English male artists